The 2001 Maine Black Bears football team represented the University of Maine during the 2001 NCAA Division I-AA football season. It was the program's 110th season and they finished in a four-way tie as Atlantic 10 Conference (A-10) co-champions with Hofstra, Villanova, and William & Mary. Each team finished with identical 7–2 conference records. The Black Bears earned a berth into the 16-team Division I-AA playoffs, but lost in the quarterfinals to Northern Iowa, 28–56. Maine was led by ninth-year head coach Jack Cosgrove.

Schedule

Awards and honors
All-America – Lennard Byrd (Associated Press); Stephen Cooper (Associated Press); Chad Hayes (Associated Press)
First Team All-Atlantic 10 – Lennard Byrd, Stephen Cooper
Second Team All-Atlantic 10 – Royston English
Third Team All-Atlantic 10 – Brendan Curry, David Cusano, Stefan Gomes, Zack Magliaro
Atlantic 10 Defensive Player of the Year – Stephen Cooper
Atlantic 10 Coach of the Year – Jack Cosgrove

References

Maine
Maine Black Bears football seasons
Atlantic 10 Conference football champion seasons
Maine Black Bears football